Kidal is a Hindu temple built under the Singhasari dynasty.  It is situated in the Rejokidal village in the Tumpang district of East Java, approximately 20 km east of Malang. The temple was built around 1248 and restored in the 1990s.  The temple is composed of three levels that are situated on a raised platform.  At the foot of the temple, three Javanese masks depict the story of Garuda.  The temple may have encased an image of Shiva depicted by the portrait of the Singhasari king, Anusapati.

See also

 Singhasari temple
 Trowulan
 Candi of Indonesia

References

Hindu temples in Indonesia
Archaeological sites in Indonesia
Buildings and structures in East Java
Singhasari
Cultural Properties of Indonesia in East Java